Martin Luther Thompson was a Texas Choctaw leader and rancher who along with his relatives, William Clyde Thompson (1839–1912), Robert E. Lee Thompson (1872–1959) and John Thurston Thompson (1864–1907), led several families of Choctaws from the Mount Tabor Indian Community in Rusk County, Texas to Pickens County, Chickasaw Nation, I.T. (now Marlow, Oklahoma)

Background
Martin, a mixed blood Choctaw and Chickasaw Indian, was the son of Thomas Umphres Thompson (1829–1864) and Martha Strong Thompson (1836–1920)  (who were first cousins) was born in Rusk County, Texas on September 20, 1857. He married Inez Monterey Fannin at Camp Colorado, Coleman County, Texas on June 22, 1876. Inez who was born on May 15, 1860 at the Mount Tabor Indian Community in Rusk County, Texas, was the daughter of William Moore Fannin (1833–1877) a mixed blood Choctaw, and Sarah Horton (1840–1928) who was also a mixed blood Indian of Choctaw, Chickasaw and Cherokee ancestry.

The couple made their homes near New London in Rusk County before relocating to the Chickasaw Nation in 1894. While living in the Chickasaw Nation, the couple lived in what is now rural Stephens County, Oklahoma near the community of Bray. Together the couple had eight children: Willie Newton (female), Althia, Decater Lee, Thomas Agatha (female), Clarence, Melissa Alavada, Cone Johnson and Mossie Brown. Martin died on August 25, 1946 in Jacksonville, Texas. He was preceded in death by his wife Inez on January 10, 1931 in Overton, Texas. Both are buried in Asbury Indian Cemetery near Troup, Texas.

Mount Tabor Indian Community and the Chickasaw Nation

Martin L. Thompson, who had been chosen the leader of the Choctaws at Mount Tabor in 1885, was passed over in favor of William Clyde Thompson, to represent the Yowani Choctaw descendants in the Chickasaw Nation, in their attempt to attain citizenship by blood in the Choctaw Nation. During the period of the Dawes Commission building of a Final Roll of the Five Civilized Tribes (1895–1907), Choctaw and Chickasaw Indians could live any place they close within the two nations. The reasons for this were many, but primarily the two tribes had been one not long before European contact. They spoke the same language, with some dialectal differences, and were culturally similar. In fact shortly after removal, the two tribes were united into one group for a short period of time. Those that did relocate to Indian Territory from east Texas settled in or near the town of Marlow, Oklahoma where William C. Thompson later served as Mayor. The lands that Martin Thompson settled was between Marlow and Bray in what is now Stephens County, Oklahoma. Although listed on the Choctaw Census as a "Choctaw Living in the Chickasaw Nation", Martin returned to Rusk County, Texas in 1896 before the close of the Dawes Roll and was therefore not entered onto the Final Roll.

Following his return to Texas he remained in a leadership position until his death. Although influential within the Mount Tabor Indian Community, the larger organization, the Texas Cherokees and Associate Bands was led only by Cherokees both within the community and in the Cherokee Nation. Most Cherokees had left Rusk County between 1866 and 1900. While the overall leadership moved from William Penn Adair until his death in Washington, D.C. in 1880, for a period it was again centered in Texas through John Martin Thompson. With his death in 1907, the Executive Committee of the Texas Cherokees and Associate Bands was shifted back to the Cherokee Nation with Claude Muskrat as Chairman. He was succeeded by W.W. Keeler who was later to serve as Principal Chief of the Cherokee Nation.

With the resignation of Keeler in  1972 and the adoption of a constitution for the Cherokee Nation of Oklahoma in 1975, the Texas Cherokee Executive Committee was again led by Texans. Judge Foster T. Bean replaced Keeler and remained in that capacity until 1988. Judge Bean was succeeded by J.C. Thompson as Chairman, serving from 1988-1998 and again from 2001-2018. J.C. Thompson being the great great nephew of Martin L. Thompson. Today, Ms Cheryl Giordano of Arp, serves as the Tribal Chairperson of MTIC, but is assisted by Deputy Chairman Rex Thompson of Troup, a direct descendant of Martin and Inez Thompson

Later life
For Martin L. Thompson, family, ranching and oil would consume the remainder of his life. His only other claim to fame was his conflict with George Fields, attorney for the Texas Cherokees and Associate Bands in the 1920s. The issue was over inclusion of the Choctaws in litigation related to the Treaty of Bowles Village in 1839. From this conflict, the word Choctaw was scratched off the documents that were to be a part of the brief submitted to the United States Supreme Court in 1921.

Although his family was not able to be listed as citizens by blood on the Final Rolls of the Choctaw Nation, his return to Texas was for the best. Oil was discovered on his land and by the time of his death he was one of the wealthiest Choctaw-Chickasaws in the United States. From this start many of his descendants went on to prosperous lives as doctors, attorneys, ranchers and teachers. His family today remains active as citizens of the Mount Tabor Indian Community with his grandson Ras Pool serving as Deputy Chairman from 2000 until his passing in 2015 and his great great grandson Rex Thompson serving also as Deputy Chairman today.

See also
 John Martin Thompson
 William Clyde Thompson
 Charles Collins Thompson
 Yowani Choctaws
 Treaty of Birds Fort
 Stephens County, Oklahoma
 Rusk County, Texas
 Smith County, Texas
 Chickasaw Nation
 Mount Tabor Indian Cemetery
 Mount Tabor Indian Community

Notes

References

Sources
  William C. Thompson, et al. vs. Choctaw Nation, MCR File 341, Bureau of Indian Affairs, Muskogee, Oklahoma
  United States Department of the Interior, Secretary of the Interior-Choctaw Citizenship Cases, #4 William C. Thompson et al., pgs 151-157
  Department of the Interior, Office of Indian Affairs correspondence between A.C. Tonner, Acting Commissioner for the Dawes Commission, and the Secretary of the Interior, April 29, 1904; ref. Land 25846-1904-Oklahoma Historical Society
  Cecil Lee Pinkston-Vinson interview with her grandfather Martin L. Thompson on March 14, 1934
  Republic of Texas Treaties; Treaty of Bowles Village February 23, 1836, Texas State Historical Society, Austin, Texas
  Treaty of Birds Fort September 29, 1843, Texas State Historical Society, Austin, Texas
  United States-Choctaw Treaties: Treaty of Doaks Stand October 18, 1820, National Archives, Fort Worth, Texas
  Starr's History of the Cherokee Indians, By Dr. Emmet Starr
  Frederick Webb Hodge, ed., Handbook of American Indians North of Mexico (2 vols., Washington: GPO, 1907, 1910, rpt., New York: Pageant, 1959)
  A History of the Caddo Indians by William B. Glover, The Louisiana Historical Quarterly, Vol. 18, No. 4. October, 1935
  The Old Mount Tabor Community, Genealogy of Old and New Cherokee Families, by George Morrison Bell Sr.
  George Fields Collection, Gilcrease Museum, Tulsa, Oklahoma
  Papers of W.W. Keeler relating to the Texas Cherokees, Cherokee National Historical Society, Tahlequah, Oklahoma
  Handbook of Texas Online: John Martin Thompson https://tshaonline.org/handbook/online/articles/fth43 (accessed September 3, 2008)
  Oklahoma Historical Society, Records of the Department of the Interior, Laws, Decisions and Regulations Affecting the work of the Commissioner to the Five Civilized Tribes 1893-1906 pgs 130-138
  The Dawes Commission and the Allotment of the Five Civilized Tribes, 1893-1914 By Kent Carter, Ancestry Publishing 1999, 13:978-0916489854
  Handbook of American Indians North of Mexico By Frederick Webb Hodge, Smithsonian Institution American Ethnology, Washington, D. C.: Government Printing Office, 1907, pgs 1001-1002, ; 13:978-0313212819
  Chief Bowles and Texas Cherokees, Chapter XI, Cherokee Claims to Land, By Mary Whatley Clarke, University of Oklahoma Press, 
  Texas-Cherokees vs United States Docket 26, 26 Ind Cl Comm. 78 (1971)
  Letter regarding Choctaw Citizenship: E.A. Newman, Broker; J.M. Humphreys, Attorney, Atoka, I.T. 2/15/1906, Martin Thompson, Overton, Texas
  Dallas Morning News, Sunday, March 8, 1940, "Owns Prerevolutionary Bible"
  LWT, Martin L. Thompson 1946, Smith County Probate Records, Smith County, Texas
  Sally (Doak) Fannin letter-1877, http://webcache.googleusercontent.com/search?q=cache:NdOzZ7u2CR4J:www.bruce-white.us/library/fannin.pdf+%22Sally+doak%22+choctaw&hl=en&ct=clnk&cd=1&gl=us

External links
Book Search, Handbook of American Indians North of Mexico, by Frederick Webb Hodge
A History of the Caddo Indians, by WILLIAM B. GLOVER
Thompson Cemetery, Rusk County, Texas; Information related to Cherokee descendants buried there, by Paul Ridenour, 2005
Mt. Tabor Indian Cemetery, Rusk County, Texas, by Paul Ridenour
Additional Mount Tabor Indian Cemetery Information, Rusk County, Texas, by Paul Ridenour
Asbury Cemetery, Smith County, Texas, Information related to Choctaw and Cherokee descendants buried there, by Paul Ridenour, 2005
Handbook of Texas Online: Yowani Indians, Margery H. Krieger
Handbook of Texas Online: Mount Tabor Indian Community, by J.C. Thompson and Patrick Pynes 
The Handbook of Texas Online: Indians by George Klos
Mt. Tabor Cemetery, Rusk County TxGenWeb
 A Starr Studded Event, April 9, 2005 by Paul Ridenour
The George Harlan Starr and Nancy (Bell) Starr Home, Located near Leveretts Chapel, Texas (Mt. Tabor Indian Community), by Paul Ridenour 2005
Ridenour's Major Ridge Home Page, by Paul Ridenour 2008
Sally (Doak) Fannin letter-1877, edited by Bruce White
The Thompson Choctaw Indians Photo Gallery, Thompson Choctaw Indian Descendants Association 2001, edited by Jesse Thompson
Mt. Tabor Indian Community Ancestral Roll, Sponsored by the Thompson-Choctaw Indian Descendants Association 2001, edited by Jesse Thompson
CHOCTAW HISTORY, STORIES AND INFO, by Mike Boucher
Museum of the Red River-The Choctaw
Official Page of Rusk County, Texas
Rusk County genealogy, by Gloria B. Mayfield
Official Page of Smith County, Texas

Native American leaders
Choctaw people
1857 births
1946 deaths
People from Rusk County, Texas
People from Stephens County, Oklahoma
20th-century Native Americans